The Decentralized Administration of Attica is one of the seven decentralized administrations of Greece, solely consisting of the region of Attica. Its seat is Athens.

Formation and tasks

Decentralized Administrations were created in January 2011 as part of a far-reaching reform of the country's administrative structure, the Kallikratis reform (Law 3852/2010).

They enjoy both administrative and financial autonomy and exercise devolved state powers in urban planning, environmental and energy policy, forestry, migration and citizenship. Beyond that, they are tasked with supervising the first and second-level self-governing bodies: the municipalities and regions, in this case the 66 municipalities of Attica and the region itself.

Characteristics

In the European NUTS nomenclature, Attica forms the first level NUTS region EL3 (Attiki).

General Secretary
The Decentralized Administration is led by a Secretary-General who is appointed or dismissed by a Cabinet decision upon request of the Greek Minister of Interior, and is therefore considered the senior representative of the national government in the regions.

In January 2014, Manolis Angelakas (Nea Dimokratia), who previously had been responsible for Peloponnese, Western Greece and the Ionian, was appointed Secretary-General. Following the electoral victory of Syriza in January 2015, the new Minister for the Interior, Nikos Voutsis, declared that the decentralized administrations would be abolished, and their powers transferred to the regions. Until this reform is formalized, and as the Secretaries-General appointed by the previous administration resigned on 2 February, the decentralized administrations are run by their senior civil servants as Acting Secretaries-General.

List of Secretaries-General
 Ilias Liakopoulos (PASOK), January 2011 – August 2012
  (Nea Dimokratia), August 2012 – January 2014
  (Nea Dimokratia), January 2014 – February 2015

References

Literature

External links
  

2011 establishments in Greece
Attica
Attica